The Tank, Heavy, TOG 1 was a prototype British heavy tank produced in the early part of the Second World War in the expectation that battlefields might end up like those of the First World War. It was designed so it could cross churned-up countryside and trenches. A single prototype was built, and followed by an improved model (the TOG 2), but interest faded with the successful performance of another cross-country design, the Churchill tank, and the mobile war that was being fought.

History
In July 1939, the Special Vehicle Development Committee was drawn up for future tank designs suitable for Great War conditions under Sir Albert Gerald Stern; who had been on the original Landship Committee and head of the Tank Supply Depot during World War I. The committee included others who had been instrumental in the development of the tank during the Great War: former Director of Naval Construction, Sir Eustace Tennyson d'Eyncourt, Major-general (retired) Sir Ernest Swinton, engine designer Harry Ricardo, the gearbox and transmission expert Major Walter Gordon Wilson. Unsurprisingly they got the nickname "The Old Gang" and the initials TOG were applied to their designs.

Together, they proposed the development of a heavy tank design, which they entrusted to another of the first tank's developers and builder of the first tank, Sir William Tritton of Foster's of Lincoln.

Their specification was comprehensive. For use against infantry, there would be Besa machine guns covering "all arcs" – one firing forward, one in each sponson, and one firing to the rear. The design was later revised with smaller sponsons containing only the Besa machine guns. To provide cover four  smoke mortars were included.

Design work by Fosters began in December 1939, resulting in a wooden mock-up. Designed with trench crossing abilities to the fore and the capability to carry infantry as well, the design as built was a large hull with side doors supported on broad tracks, with a 2-pdr-gun-armed Matilda II infantry tank turret. The front plate of the hull carried the 75 mm gun and mounting as used on the French Char B1 tank. Neither of the planned sponson designs was ever actually installed on the prototype hull.

It was realised that running the track drive over the top of the hull was not necessary and work began on a follow-up design in June 1940. The prototype TOG I was delivered in October 1940. Due to the weight, electrical drive was used – the engine driving two generators connected to an electrical motor for each track. The steering wheel was connected to a potentiometer that varied the voltage to the track motors. This strained the drive and track. Due to these problems, it was converted to a hydraulic drive designed by Fluidrive Engineering, a process that took until May 1943 after which it was called TOG 1A. The fluid drive was not satisfactory either. The prototype was sent to Chobham and then seems to have disappeared into history.

Notes

References

White BT, British Tanks 1915-1945 Ian Allan Publishing, London
 
Chamberlain, P; Ellis, C British and American Tanks of World War II 1969. Arco Publishing

External links
Great Britain's Heavy Tanks archive link
Tank, Heavy, TOG 1 

Abandoned military projects of the United Kingdom
Super-heavy tanks
World War II tanks of the United Kingdom
History of the tank